Each BBC Radio 4 programme Desert Island Discs invites a castaway to choose eight pieces of music, a book (in addition to the Bible - or a religious text appropriate to that person's beliefs - and the Complete Works of Shakespeare) and a luxury item that they would take to an imaginary desert island, where they will be marooned indefinitely. The rules state that the chosen luxury item must not be anything animate or indeed anything that enables the castaway to escape from the island, for instance a radio set, sailing yacht or aeroplane. The choices of book and luxury can sometimes give insight into the guest's life, and the choices of guests between 2001 and 2010 are listed here.

Very rarely programmes will be repeated in place of new shows as a tribute to former guests who have recently died – for example Radio 4 repeated Humphrey Lyttelton's show, originally aired on 5 November 2006, on 15 June 2008. Desert Island Discs takes two short breaks, in spring and summer. BBC Radio 4 broadcasts new programmes for approximately 42 weeks each year on Sunday mornings, usually with a repeat transmission five days later. On Remembrance Sunday (in November) the programme is not broadcast but that week's programme gets a single airing in the Friday repeat slot.

2001

2002

2003

2004

2005

2006

2007

2008

2009

2010

 Instead of the Bible: The Bhagavad Gita
 Instead of the Bible: The Gathas of Zarathustra
 Instead of the Bible: The Mahābhārata
 Instead of the Bible: The Qur'an
 Instead of the Complete Works of Shakespeare: The Complete Works of Goethe
 No bible
 Instead of the Bible: The Torah

Episodes (2001-2010)
Lists of British radio series episodes
2000s in the United Kingdom
2000s in British music
2010s in the United Kingdom
2010s in British music